DMIS may refer to:
Doha Modern Indian School
Developmental Model of Intercultural Sensitivity or Bennett scale
Dimensional Measuring Interface Standard or Dimensional metrology

See also
Doctor of Missiology (DMiss)
DMI (disambiguation)